Phrynopus thompsoni is a species of frog in the family Strabomantidae.
It is endemic to Peru.

References

thompsoni
Amphibians of the Andes
Amphibians of Peru
Endemic fauna of Peru
Taxonomy articles created by Polbot
Amphibians described in 2000